Thomas or Tom Ferguson may refer to:

 Thomas Roberts Ferguson (1818–1879), Ontario businessman and political figure
 Thomas Ferguson (1820–1900), founder of Thomas Ferguson & Co Ltd, an Irish linen Jacquard weaver in Ireland
 Thomas B. Ferguson, United States Ambassador to Sweden, 1894–1898
 Thomas Ferguson (medical doctor) (1900–1977), Scottish surgeon and professor of public health
 Thomas Stuart Ferguson (1915–1983), American archaeologist 
 Tom Ferguson (footballer) (1920–2008), Australian footballer for Melbourne
 Thomas Ferguson (goalkeeper) (died 1955), Scottish football goalkeeper (Falkirk FC) 
 Thomas S. Ferguson (born 1929), American mathematician and statistician
 Thomas C. Ferguson (born 1933), former United States Ambassador to Brunei
 Thomas William Ferguson (1943–2006), American medical doctor and author
 Thomas Ferguson (academic) (born 1949), American political scientist/economist and author
 Thomas A. Ferguson (born 1950), official in the U.S. Dept. of the Treasury
 Tom R. Ferguson (born 1950), rodeo cowboy
 Tom Ferguson (American football), American football offensive tackle
 Tom Ferguson (politician), Green Party candidate for Niagara West—Glanbrook in the 2004 Canadian federal election

See also
 Thomas Fergusson (disambiguation)
 Thompson B. Ferguson, governor of Oklahoma Territory